St. Patrick's C.Y.F.C. is an Irish association football club based in Ringsend, Dublin. Their senior team play in the Leinster Senior League Senior Division. They also regularly compete in the FAI Cup, the FAI Intermediate Cup, the FAI Junior Cup and the Leinster Senior Cup. 
St. Pat's also have reserve teams playing in the Leinster Senior League and enter teams in the Dublin & District Schoolboy League.

History
St. Patrick's C.Y.F.C. were founded in 1936 by members of the Ringsend–based St. Patrick’s branch of the Catholic Young Men's Society and as a result they were originally known as St. Patrick’s C.Y.M.S. They adopted their current abbreviation in 1984. Members of an Edinburgh–based CYMS branch had earlier founded Hibernian F.C. Coincidentally the Edinburgh branch was also known as St. Patrick's and early Hibs teams also played in green hoops. During the 1940s St. Patrick’s C.Y.M.S. played in the Athletic Union League and in 1945–46 won the FAI Junior Cup for the first time. In 1972–73 they were finalists again but lost to Tolka Rovers. In 1978–79 they won the FAI Junior Cup for a second time. In 1987 they also won the Leinster Junior Cup, beating local rivals Liffey Wanderers 2–1 in the final at Tolka Park. In 2011–12 they were Leinster Senior Cup finalists. In the quarter–finals they defeated Bray Wanderers 3–0 and in the semi-finals they defeated UCD 2–1, however they lost the final 1–0 to Shamrock Rovers.

Notable former players

Republic of Ireland internationals
  Mick O'Flanagan
  Mick Smyth

Honours
FAI Junior Cup
Winners: 1945–46, 1978–79: 2
Runners-up: 1972–73: 1 
Leinster Junior Cup
Winners:  1987: 1 
Leinster Senior Cup
Runners-up: 2011–12: 1

References

Ringsend
Leinster Senior League (association football) clubs
Association football clubs in Dublin (city)
1936 establishments in Ireland
Association football clubs established in 1936
Former Athletic Union League (Dublin) clubs